The Thai Bangkaew Dog is an Asian dog breed. It is a medium-sized spitz-type dog.

Appearance
The Thai Bangkaew Dog is compactly built and square in profile. It is well proportioned, with a smooth gait. The double coat consists of a short undercoat, with longer guard hairs growing through it forming the outer coat. The coat is thicker and longer around the neck, chest, and back forming a lion-like ruff, which is more noticeable on male dogs than on female dogs. The plumed tail is carried with moderate upward curve over the back. The breed comes in white with shades of red, grey, brown, and black in a wide variety of patterns. There are some that have white coats.

History
Bangkaew is a village located in the Bang Rakam District, Phitsanulok Province in the central region of Thailand. In this district, near the Yom River, a Buddhist abbot's local black and white female dog was crossed with a now extinct wild dog, producing the first of the breed. Since 1957, selective breeding from their single litters produced today's breed.

Health and temperament
This is an intelligent, athletic, agile and robust breed. It will be a loyal and protective family companion as well as an excellent watchdog. The Thai Bangkaew Dog is a loving, intelligent and alert dog that makes an excellent and devoted family companion as well as a good working and hunting dog. This breed will be affectionate with its family, will get along well with children and a properly socialized dog will be gentle with smaller children.

The Thai Bangkaew Dog is not an aggressive breed but can be aloof with strangers and is very territorial and protective. However, this breed is more likely to threaten than bite and attack. It makes a great guardian and watchdog that will loudly announce arrival of any visitor (friend or stranger).

The Thai Bangkaew Dog is a breed that is known to be very aggressive towards other dogs. With other animals your dog will get along well if you start socialization from a very young age. This breed is definitely for an experienced owner.

The Thai Bangkaew Dog is an intelligent breed, but is independent and can be stubborn. Therefore, it's not always easy to train. This breed needs consistent training in short sessions with many rewards such as treats or praise. Avoid repetitive tasks, as this dog gets bored quickly.

In summary, the Thai Bangkaew Dog needs a confident and experienced owner who can earn the dog's trust and respect. Socialization must start from a very young age.

See also
 Dogs portal
 List of dog breeds

References

FCI breeds
Dog breeds originating in Thailand
Spitz breeds
Rare dog breeds